Judge Nelson may refer to:

David Aldrich Nelson (1932–2010), judge of the United States Court of Appeals for the Sixth Circuit
David Sutherland Nelson (1933–1998), judge of the United States District Court for the District of Massachusetts
Debra S. Nelson (fl. 1990s–2010s), Florida judge who presided over the trial of George Zimmerman
Dorothy Wright Nelson (born 1928), judge of the United States Court of Appeals for the Ninth Circuit
Edwin L. Nelson (1940–2003), judge of the United States District Court for the Northern District of Alabama
Foggy Nelson, fictional Marvel Comics character who was a judge in the "Secret Wars" storyline
Gary K. Nelson (1935–2013), judge of the Arizona Court of Appeals
Rensselaer Nelson (1826–1904), judge of the United States District Court for the District of Minnesota
Ryan D. Nelson (born 1973), judge of the United States Court of Appeals for the Ninth Circuit
Susan Richard Nelson (born 1952), judge of the United States District Court for the District of Minnesota
Thomas G. Nelson (1936–2011), judge of the United States Court of Appeals for the Ninth Circuit
Thomas Leverett Nelson (1827–1897), judge of the United States District Court for the District of Massachusetts
William Nelson (New York politician) (1784–1869), New York state court judge
William Nelson (British judge) (born c. 1981), judge of the Magistrates' Courts of England and Wales

See also
Justice Nelson (disambiguation)